Don Gregorio Pelaéz Sports Complex is a group of sports facilities in Cagayan de Oro. This sports center was built in 1969 and hosted the first Palarong Pambansa in Mindanao in 1975. It is the oldest sports park in Northern Mindanao and it first opened its door to baseball and basketball in 1970. Also, the stadium was the largest in Mindanao since 1998 after its renovation. It has a seating capacity of 20,000.

Sports Event
 1975, 1977, 1978, 1988 Palarong Pambansa
 2002 Mindanao Friendship games
 Milo Little Olympics - Mindanao (Since 1997)
2008 Philippine Olympic Festival & National Championships
2010 National Milo Little Olympics
2011 PFF–Smart Club Championships (elimination round)
 2014 Mindanao Unity Games (INC)

See also
 Cagayan de Oro

References

Buildings and structures in Cagayan de Oro
Sports complexes in the Philippines
Football venues in the Philippines
Sports in Misamis Oriental